The Album (also known as Haddaway in North America and L'Album in France) is the debut album by Trinidadian-German Eurodance recording artist Haddaway, released in May 1993 by Coconut Records. It includes the hit singles "What Is Love" and "Life". The lead single, "What Is Love", was certified gold by the RIAA for sales of over 500,000 copies. In 2011, the album was released onto the iTunes Store by Razor & Tie.

Critical reception
Alan Jones from Music Week wrote, "Not a one-hit wonder" proclaimed the posters flagging Haddaway's second single "Life", and they were right. Nor, on the evidence here, will he stop at two hits. His career-launching "What Is Love" is the pick of the pack for sure, but there's enough upbeat and commercial house and hi-NRG here to ensure he has a run of hits. This type of album is, however, notoriously difficult to get away, as even his labelmates Snap have discovered."

Track listing

Notes
  signifies a remixer

Personnel
 All songs arranged by Dee Dee Halligan and Alex Trime, except "Yeah" and "Mama's House" (arranged by Trime/Haddaway/Gary Jones) and "Sing About Love" (arranged by Trime/Haddaway)
 Produced by Dee Dee Halligan and Junior Torello, except "Sing About Love" (produced by Haddaway, Alex Trime and Walter Bee)
 Recorded and mixed by Gary Jones, except track 7 (mixed by Gary Jones and Henning McCoy)
 Track 6 remixed by The Rapino Brothers; track 12 remixed by Jones/Trime
 All songs on original recording published by A La Carte Music.
 Haddaway – lead vocals
 Lisa Noya - backing vocals on The Album, additional backing vocals on The Album 2nd Edition by Elkie Schlimbach, Rena T. Otta 
 Alex Trime – keyboards

Charts

Weekly charts

Year-end charts

Certifications and sales

References

External links
 [ Overview of Album]
 Haddaway – The Album

1993 debut albums
Arista Records albums
Haddaway albums